Baka Khel Wazir is a town and union council in Bannu District of Khyber-Pakhtunkhwa. It is located at North Waziristan 32°57'19N 70°30'18E and has an altitude of 396 metres (1302 feet).

References

Union councils of Bannu District
Populated places in Bannu District